Kim Planert is a German film and television composer based in Los Angeles. He has composed music for over 230 episodes of prime-time television shows and feature films. His collection of TV credits include: eight seasons on the score for ABC's television show, Castle, Timeless (NBC), Missing (ABC), The Whispers (ABC series produced by Steven Spielberg), The McKenna Files (Mark Gordon, ABC Pilot), The Unit (CBS), Lie To Me (FOX), The Gates (ABC), The Chicago Code (FOX), Last Resort (ABC) and Rush (USA Network)

His film credits include I Into The Blue 2: The Reef. A Reason and Chasing Grace. Feature documentary film credits include Skid Row Marathon, and The Game: Gambling Between Life and Death, which had its theatrical premiere at the Hof International Film Festival in 2021, followed by the television premiere on the Bayerischer Rundfunk. Planert has also written music for video games such as Final Fantasy’s Agni's Philosophy E3 Trailer and the spatial audio score for Oculus’ virtual reality (VR) game DAVID. In 2022, Studio Babelsberg launched their new image trailer for which Planert contributed the music. The film and music can also be seen and heard in an exhibition in one of Germany’s major film museums, the Potsdam Film Museum.

Besides scoring, Planert has released two solo albums thus far. His first solo album Skylight: Notes from a Logbook takes inspiration from his passion for flying as a former Wingsuit Skydiver, and the recovery from a life-altering accident. In 2022, Planert released his second solo project: neoclassical album Being. Stand-alone singles include Lux Ex Tenebris and Dawn. The corresponding music video of Dawn supported the inclusion campaign Ability in Progress. The music video of Lux Ex Tenebris screened at Oscar qualifying festivals CineQuest, BronzeLens, and the Dawn won ‘Best Music Video’ at the Oxford International Film Festival as well as ‘Director’s Choice Award’ at the 41st Thomas Edison Film Festival.

Biography 
At the age of 19, Planert made four tours to former Yugoslavia during the Bosnian War to provide humanitarian aid. One of Planert’s first songs made it through the frontline into the "Pocket of Bihać" and was played on radio Bihać. He wrote the song for the people of the city, who were at the time surrounded by Serbian forces.

Before moving to Los Angeles, Planert resided in the UK where he collaborated with music producers and musicians including Craig Armstrong, Capercaillie, Secret Garden, John McLaughlin (FIVE), Dave James (Take That), Gordon Goudie (Simple Minds),  Karen Matheson, Phil Cunningham, James Grant, Karen Casey, Michael McGoldrick, The Dhol Foundation, Phamie Gow, BBC Scottish Symphony Orchestra, and the Scottish Ensemble.

He worked as a sound engineer and producer for over a decade and recorded and mixed more than 40 albums as well as soundtracks for several films including American Cousins, The Bone Collector, One Last Chance and the TV show Crowdie + Cream - which won a BAFTA award for "Best Soundtrack" and "Best Theme".

After moving to Los Angeles, Planert started to collaborate with Robert Duncan on numerous shows between 2008 and 2016. Scoring prime time TV shows and movies, Planert gained profound film and television industry experience in Duncan's mentorship.

Planert and Duncan won "Best Score in a TV Show" at the Hollywood Music In Media Awards for Missing (ABC), in addition Skid Row Marathon was awarded with the Crystal Pine Award for "Best Original Score Documentary" at the International Sound & Film Music Festival in 2019. In the same year Planert’s music piece B.S.B.D. from his first solo album Skylight was nominated for the Jerry Goldsmith Award.

Planert is a former skydiver with 402 jumps totaling over 17 hours of free fall time. His wingsuit jumps include competing in the US National Championships and flying over Panama, Hawaii and Burning Man. His passion for wingsuiting as well as his accident are the foundation of his first solo album Skylight.

Planert scored the project Skid Row Marathon, a feature-length documentary following the story of a Los Angeles judge who starts a running club on Skid Row to give its members a second chance at life as they battle their addictions. Planert invited a former addict and homeless musician (one of the subjects of the documentary) to work on the score with him and also conduct a cue at the final scoring session. They still frequently collaborate.

As a producer, Planert joined the teams on Skid Row Marathon, A Reason and Chasing Grace in bringing the projects to life. He also has his own productions in development including a TV series based on his brother's humanitarian aid work during the Bosnian war.

With The Game: Gambling between Life and Death, Planert returned to the plight of the refugees beaten back, tortured and starved at the European border. The score features the Budapest Scoring Orchestra, Duduk performed by Chris Bleth (The Mandalorian, Star Trek), and the voice of Iranian Singer Azam Ali (Niyaz, 300, Matrix).

Discography

Television series

Film

Advertising, trailers and corporate video

Video Games

Awards

Producer

Sound engineer

References

External links 
 
 

Living people
Southern Cross University alumni
German film score composers
Male film score composers
German male composers
People from Los Angeles
Year of birth missing (living people)
People from Goslar (district)
German emigrants to the United States